The Pakistan Women cricket team toured England in June–July 2016. The tour consisted of a three One Day Internationals (ODIs) matches series as well as three Twenty20 Internationals (T20Is) series. England won both series by 3–0.

Squads

ODI series

1st ODI

2nd ODI

3rd ODI

T20I series

1st T20I

2nd T20I

3rd T20I

References

External links 
 Series home on ESPNCricinfo

 

Women's cricket tours of England
International cricket competitions in 2016
2014–16 ICC Women's Championship
2016 in English women's cricket
2016 in Pakistani cricket
England 2016
2016 in women's cricket
2016 in Pakistani women's sport